is a Japanese voice acting entertainment company founded by Atsushi Fujisaki in April 2008.

Attached talent
Male
 Kazuo Asakura
 Sumitada Azumano
 Masashi Igarashi
 ikki
 Hidekazu Uto
 Yoshihisa Kawahara
 Naru Kawamoto
 Toshiaki Kuwahara
 Fuminori Komatsu
 Tsuyoshi Koyama
 Naoya Nakanishi
 Kouji Namekata
 Yoshiaki Hasegawa
 Natsuki Hanae
 Tomoyasu Hishiba
 Yuichi Fujita
 Yuichi Jose
 Chado Horii
 Taishi Murata
 Takuma Motoyuki
 Shugo Nakamura
 Kōichi Yamadera
 Hisayoshi Yamane
 Ryo Wakabayashi
Female
 Kanako Ishida
 Yūko Ishibashi
 Mariya Ise
 Oura Fuyuka
 Nami Okamoto
 Ikuko Kato
 Tomoko Kaneda
 Rie Kikuchi
 Marimo Kitagawa
 Kanae Kuninaka
 Miyu Komaki
 Michiko Komatsu
 Chie Sawaguchi
 Rina Shiratori
 Mayuko Suzuki
 Yukiko Takashima
 Kaori Takaoka
 Yoshiko Takeda
 Ai Terashima
 Misako Tomioka
 Nakano Nozomi
 Rinko Natsuhi
 Teruko Nishikawa
 Mami Nishikawa
 Arisa Nishiguchi
 Sandra Hijikata
 Yuka Hirata
 Kanami Satō
 Yasuko Fujino
 Yuuki Matsumoto
 Akira Miki
 Kaoru Mizuhara
 Yukako Mino
 Rei Mochiduki
 Kiyu Morita
 Sayaka Yukino
 Tomoe Watanabe
 Aya Uchida
 Nichika Ōmori
 Ai Furihata
 Ayaka Fukuhara
 Mei Hanakawa

Formerly attached talent
 Goblin
 Hiroki Gotō
 Mitsuo Iwata
 Ryōtsu Saitō

Notes

References

External links
 

Japanese voice actor management companies
Japanese companies established in 2008
Entertainment companies established in 2008